The Pinacate Mining District is 5 to 8 miles southwest of Perris, California.  It included the Good Hope Mine, Steele's Mine, Santa Rosa (Rosalia) Mine, Virginia or Shay Mine, Santa Fe Mine and many other smaller works like the Little Maggie Mine. It produced a total of about 104,000 ounces of gold through 1959, all from the lodes of various mines. The district declined until the mid-1930s, when attempts were made to rehabilitate the Good Hope and several other mines. These efforts were largely unsuccessful, the Good Hope mine closed when it was flooded with underground water. Only three ounces of gold were produced in the district between 1943 and 1959.

References 
  Report of the State Mineralogist, California State Mining Bureau, State Office, 1893, pg. 384-385
 Report of the State Mineralogist, California State Mining Bureau, State Office, 1894, pg 220-223
 Tom Hudson, Lake Elsinore Valley, its story 1776-1977, 2nd Ed., Published by author, 1988. 
 Western Mining History, Riverside County California Gold Production

History of Riverside County, California
Perris, California
Pinacate Mining District
Mining in Riverside County, California